KGVA (88.1 FM), is a public radio station in Fort Belknap Agency, Montana, serving residents of the Fort Belknap Indian Reservation. Programming on KGVA consists of local programming, including native, oldies, Top 40 and Adult Contemporary music, plus programs from National Public Radio and Native Voice One.

External links

NPR member stations
GVA
Native American radio
Community radio stations in the United States
Radio stations established in 1952
Fort Belknap Indian Reservation